Admir Ljevaković (born 7 August 1984 in Tešanj) is a former Bosnian footballer. He played 14 seasons for FK Teplice in the Czech First League, since August 2007 when he signed a three-year deal with the club.

Records
In 2021 he became the first foreigner in history to appear in 300 games in the Czech First League.

As of November 2021, Admir Ljevaković holds the record of most received yellow cards in the history of the Czech First League (106 yellow cards). However he received only one red card.

Personal life
In June 2009 he married a handball player Senija Jabandžić with whom he has two sons: Mak and Din.

References

External links
 

1984 births
Living people
People from Tešanj
Association football midfielders
Bosnia and Herzegovina footballers
NK TOŠK Tešanj players
NK Čelik Zenica players
FK Teplice players
Premier League of Bosnia and Herzegovina players
Czech First League players
Bosnia and Herzegovina expatriate footballers
Expatriate footballers in the Czech Republic
Bosnia and Herzegovina expatriate sportspeople in the Czech Republic